The 69th Street Transfer Bridge, part of the West Side Line of the New York Central Railroad, was a dock for car floats which allowed the transfer of railroad cars from the rail line to car floats which crossed the Hudson River to the Weehawken Yards in New Jersey. Its innovative linkspan design kept the boxcars from falling into the river while being loaded.

After it fell into disuse, it was in danger of being torn down and removed, but around the year 2000, during renovations of Riverside Park, following the example of Gantry Plaza State Park, it became a prominent feature of the park.  It was listed on the National Register of Historic Places in 2003.

Similar facilities are in use between 65th Street Yard in Brooklyn and Greenville Yard in Jersey City by the New York New Jersey Rail, LLC, which still operates car floats across Upper New York Bay.

, the New York City Department of Parks is in the design phase of a project to reconstruct, restore and adaptively reuse the 69th Street Transfer Bridge.

See also 

65th Street Yard
 Gantry crane
 Link span
 Moveable bridges
 New York Central Tugboat 13
 Pier 63

References

External links 
Archiplanet.org

Bridges in Manhattan
New York City Designated Landmarks in Manhattan
Railroad bridges on the National Register of Historic Places in New York (state)
Buildings and structures on the National Register of Historic Places in Manhattan
Hudson River
New York Central Railroad
Water transportation in New York City
Railroad bridges in New York (state)
Transportation buildings and structures in Manhattan
West Side Line